The Romano R.110 was a twin-engine 3-seat fighter aircraft, designed by Etienne Romano in the 1930s. A single prototype was built, but it was not successful, the Potez 630 being preferred.

Design and description
On 31 October 1934 the French Air Ministry released a specification for a twin-engine multi-seat fighter aircraft, which would be required to fulfil several roles. A three seat version (C3 under the French designation scheme) would be used to command formations of smaller single-engine fighters, while two seat versions would be used to daylight bomber escort and attack (C2) or as night-fighters (CN2). Bids were received from a number of aircraft designers, including Breguet Aviation (the 690), Hanriot (the H.220), Potez (the 630) and Romano. The Romano design, the R.110, was a low-winged monoplane with a retractable tailwheel undercarriage. It was of mixed wood and metal construction, and was powered by two  Renault 12R-02 air-cooled V-12 engines. It carried the specified armament of two fixed  cannon and a single flexibly mounted  machine gun. 

Construction of the prototype was relatively slow and it did not fly until 30 March 1938. By this time, the Potez 630 (which had first flown in 1936) had already been chosen to meet the requirement and was about to enter production, so development of the R.110 was abandoned.

Specifications

References

1930s French fighter aircraft
R.110
Biplanes
Aircraft first flown in 1938
Twin piston-engined tractor aircraft